Ted Brown may refer to:
Ted Brown (engineer) (born 1938), Australian expert in rock mechanics
Ted Brown (American football) (born 1957), American football player
Ted Brown (Australian footballer) (1891–1958), Australian rules footballer for Carlton
Ted Brown (saxophonist) (born 1927), American jazz tenor saxophonist
Ted Brown (radio) (1924–2005), American radio personality
Ted Brown (baseball), American baseball player
Ted W. Brown (1906–1984), Ohio Secretary of State, 1951–1979
Teddy Brown (1900–1946), American pop musician

See also
Edward Brown (disambiguation)